Dear Brigitte is a 1965 American DeLuxe Color family–comedy in CinemaScope starring James Stewart and directed by Henry Koster.

Plot

Robert Leaf (James Stewart) is an American college professor, who won a Pulitzer for poetry and prizes the arts.  Both Robert and Vina (Glynis Johns) are dedicated to the arts and prompt their children, Pandora and Erasmus, to develop artistic skills.  The Leaf family lives on a houseboat in San Francisco.  The Captain (Ed Wynn) sold the Leafs the boat and lives with them; he provides narration.

Professor Leaf, in particular, is dismayed to discover that eight-year-old Erasmus (Billy Mumy) is tone-deaf and colorblind, as he can't share the family's artistic pursuits.  Moreover, Erasmus is a mathematical prodigy.  The Professor is wary, wanting him to understand that this is only one part of his life.  Erasmus agrees, but unwittingly calls media attention to himself by correcting figures at a bank.  After, his parents become very determined that he have a normal child's life, and they decide to have him talk to a psychiatrist.  Erasmus tells the psychiatrist that math is okay, but he really loves French movie star Brigitte Bardot and writes her love letters.

18-year-old Pandora (Cindy Carol) and her friends pay Erasmus to do their math homework (he uses the money for airmail stamps to send his letters to Brigitte).  The Leafs take Erasmus for testing at the university; he agrees to be tested if they'll pay him.  He answers questions correctly before the computer can calculate, and the officials push for more tests.  The Leafs refuse, wanting him to have a normal childhood; besides, Erasmus wants to leave.

Called to the Dean's office, a sheriff informs the Professor that Erasmus has been using his skills to calculate bets for an undercover campus betting ring run by Ken Taylor (Fabian), Panny's boyfriend, who was paying him to pick winners. Accused of complicity, the Professor quits his job and storms home.  He and Vina question Ken and Panny.  When paid, Erasmus shows his parents that he calculates winners by reading daily racetrack newspaper entries; Penny reveals that he spends his earnings on stamps.  Troubled, his parents discuss if Erasmus deciding odds for people is immoral/ethical or not, concluding it's wrong.

The Professor applies for unemployment and is told that he must wait two weeks for a check.  Erasmus gives him the money that he's saved up from doing math problems, so that Penny can have a new prom dress.  While buying it for her, they meet Dr. Peregrine Upjohn (John Williams), who admires the Professor.  That evening, the Professor's delighted to learn from Erasmus' psychiatrist that his son loves Brigitte Bardot, as Erasmus has been unhappy with the attention paid to his math skills and this is such a regular interest.

Upjohn proposes they found the Leaf Foundation to fund liberal arts scholarships.  The Professor and Vina love this idea.  During their talk, students march to the houseboat, demanding that the Professor return to work; he accepts and announces the Foundation.  Conferring, the Leafs decide that it isn't unethical to ask Erasmus if they can use his talent to fundraise for such a good cause.

Brigitte invites Erasmus to visit her in France. Upjohn suggests that Erasmus go, as it'll promote the Foundation.  The Professor accompanies him, Upjohn assisting the Leafs with their flight costs.  At Brigitte's house, Erasmus stares at her adoringly, barely speaking, and asks for her autograph.  The Professor takes a picture of them together, despite Erasmus looking at Brigitte, not at the camera.  She gives him a puppy from her pet poodle and thinks he's adorable.

Upon returning, Erasmus calculates different bets to fundraise.  While falling asleep one night, he says, "Fromage," leading the adults to think he's picking longest of long-shots, "French Cheese" in the sixth race.  At the track the next day, he denies picking her, to everyone's horror.  French Cheese wins her race, and the family's ecstatic.  The Professor then realizes that Upjohn, who held the tickets, has left the stands.  Upjohn, who's actually a con artist and plans to abscond with the funds, is collecting the winnings.  The Professor finds him and grabs the bag of money, declaring that it's for the Foundation. The Dean affirms this statement.  The press overhears and asks for a photo-op of the Professor, the Dean, and the Foundation's new endowment.

Cast

 James Stewart as Professor Leaf
 Fabian as Kenneth
 Glynis Johns as Vina
 Cindy Carol as Pandora
 Billy Mumy as Erasmus
 John Williams as Upjohn
 Jack Kruschen as Dr. Volker
 Charles Robinson as George 
 Howard Freeman as Dean Sawyer 
 Jane Wald as Terry
 Alice Pearce as Unemployment Clerk 
 Jesse White as Argyle
 Gene O'Donnell as Lt. Rink 
 Orville Sherman as Von Schlogg 
 Maida Severn as School Teacher
 Pitt Herbert as Bank Manager
 Adair Jameson as Saleslady
 Marcel de la Brosse as Taxi Driver
 and Ed Wynn as The Captain (also the narrator, who frequently breaks the fourth wall)

Production
The novel was published in 1963. There was some talk that Disney would option the film rights and cast Bing Crosby in the lead role. However rights were bought by 20th Century Fox who assigned the project to Nunnally Johnson, Henry Koster and James Stewart, the team that made Mr Hobbs Takes a Vacation and Take Her, She's Mine.

Johnson later said he "hadn't wanted to do" the film. "I didn't think there was enough material in it, but I really allowed myself to be persuaded to do it. Jimmie [sic] would sign if I would write it, and Koster would get a job if Jimmie [sic] would sign. It all got around that, one depending on another. There was no material in there that justified a picture."

Although Nunnally Johnson wrote early drafts of the film, Hal Kanter was brought in to work on it and he gets sole screen credit. Kanter says it was Henry Koster's idea to introduce a captain, played by Ed Wynn, to act as a Greek chorus.

Johnson said Koster got this idea from the film Tom Jones. Johnson did not like the device because he felt it did not suit the picture and told Koster to get another writer to do it. He told Koster "You'd better get a good gag man who does  those one-line things. I don't do that, and I couldn't do it." Koster hired Kanter and Johnson asked to take his name off the film. Johnson says when he saw Stewart "he told me he didn't know I'd taken my name off of it. He was unhappy  about the picture too, but there was nothing to do by then."

It was one of the first movies made at the recently re-opened 20th Century Fox studios.

Billy Mumy was cast on the recommendation of James Stewart's wife, Gloria Stewart, who taught a Sunday School class that Mumy attended.

Johnson later said, "Henry was an old-fashioned fellow, and If it hadn't have  been for the fact that Jimmie [sic] Stewart was the leading man in the pictures, he would have expired much earlier than he did. 
I'm afraid he's through now, you know. But I've seen him, and there's nothing sadder than these old directors who disappear and don't get jobs. In the old days, a fellow  wrote a script, they hired a director. Now,  quite often,  unless they can get somebody like Willie Wyler or Billy Wilder or somebody like that, the writer directs it. This  all goes to prove, to me anyway, that the old-time directors, were a real collection of frauds."
 
The film was the sixth straight acting role for Fabian since he quit singing. He had previously appeared in Mr Hobbs Takes a Vacation. He had never been to the races before being cast, so he researched his role by going to the races and developing a betting system.

There was some doubt Bardot would appear in the film but she relented and her scenes were shot in three days in Paris.

Reception
According to Fox records, the film needed to earn $4,500,000 in rentals to break even and made $2,920,000, meaning it made a loss.

See also
List of American films of 1965

References

Notes

External links
 
 
 
 
 

1965 films
1965 comedy films
20th Century Fox films
American comedy films
Brigitte Bardot
Cultural depictions of Brigitte Bardot
1960s English-language films
Films scored by George Duning
Films about con artists
Films based on American novels
Films directed by Henry Koster
Films set in Paris
Films set in San Francisco
Films with screenplays by Nunnally Johnson
CinemaScope films
1960s American films